Felise is a Polynesian name. Notable people with the name include:

Maika Felise, a Samoan rugby league player and surfer
Felise Kaufusi (born 1992), a New Zealand-born Australian rugby league player
JJ Felise (born 1996), an Australian rugby league player

See also
Taufaʻao Filise (born 1977), a Tongan rugby union player
Felice, an unrelated name